John Geoffrey Inge (born 26 February 1955) is a bishop in the Church of England. He is currently the Bishop of Worcester in the Diocese of Worcester. From 2003 to 2007, he was Bishop of Huntingdon, a suffragan bishop in the Diocese of Ely.

Early life and education 
John Inge was born to Geoffrey Alfred and Elsie Inge (née Hill) on 26 February 1955,. He was educated at Kent College in Canterbury, at that time an all-boys direct grant grammar school, now a private school in Kent. He went on to study chemistry at St Chad's College, Durham University, graduating with a Bachelor of Science (BSc) degree in 1977. That same year Inge performed with Arthur Bostrom at the Edinburgh Festival as part of Durham University Sensible Thespians (DUST), which would be renamed the Durham Revue in 1988. In 1979, he undertook teacher training at Keble College, Oxford and received a Postgraduate Certificate in Education (PGCE).

Having studied chemistry at university and completed teacher training, Inge began his first career as a secondary school teacher. He taught chemistry at Lancing College, in West Sussex. He also served as a tutor of Teme House, one of the school's boarding houses.

He trained for ordination at the College of the Resurrection, Mirfield. During his ministry, he returned to Durham University for postgraduate study. He completed a Master of Arts (MA) degree in systematic theology in 1994 and a Doctor of Philosophy (PhD) in 2002.

Ordained ministry
Inge was ordained in the Church of England as a deacon at Petertide 1984 (30 June), by Eric Kemp, Bishop of Chichester, in Chichester Cathedral and as a priest in Lancing College Chapel on 7 July the next year. From 1984 to 1986, he was the assistant chaplain at Lancing College. He was junior chaplain at Harrow School from 1987 to 1989 and senior chaplain from 1989 to 1990. From 1990 to 1996 he was the vicar of St Luke's Wallsend in the Diocese of Newcastle, where he also chaired the Board for Mission and Social Responsibility. He became a canon residentiary of Ely Cathedral in 1996 with particular responsibility for education and mission. He served as vice dean from 1999 to 2003.

Episcopal ministry
Inge was consecrated a bishop on 9 October 2003 by Rowan Williams, Archbishop of Canterbury, at Westminster Abbey, to serve as Bishop of Huntingdon (suffragan bishop in the Diocese of Ely). As the warden for readers in the Ely diocese he encouraged and equipped lay ministry; he chaired the Cambridgeshire Ecumenical Council and co-chaired the East of England Faiths Council. In July 2007 he was nominated to become the bishop of Worcester, and his election was confirmed on 20 November 2007. He was enthroned at Worcester Cathedral as the bishop of Worcester on 1 March 2008.

Other work
Inge served as chair of the board of the College of Evangelists from 2010 to 2018. He served as a member of the Faith and Order Commission (FAOC) from 2011 to 2016 and on the council of Ridley Hall, Cambridge from  2004 to 2010.  He was for some years a trustee of Common Purpose UK, an international, not-for-profit organisation which organises leadership courses across the UK and abroad for the public, private and voluntary sectors, and for which he is now a trust protector. He chairs the council for the Archbishop of Canterbury's Examination (Lambeth Degree) in Theology which awards the Lambeth Degree — an MA, MPhil or PhD in theology. He is also an advisor for the independent public policy think tank ResPublica. He served as Visitor to the Community of the Holy Name from 2007 to 2020 and Visitor to Mucknell Abbey from 2009 to 2020. He was lead bishop on cathedrals and church buildings from 2014 to 2019.

Inge has led numerous groups to Africa, India, South America, Russia and the Holy Land. Whilst vice dean of Ely Cathedral he established a link between Ely and the Anglican cathedral of Christ Church, Zanzibar and is active in Worcester diocesan links with the Morogoro diocese in the Anglican Church of Tanzania and the Anglican diocese of Peru. He is a longstanding supporter of the World Development Movement, which campaigns for justice and development in the Global South, and of Amnesty International.

Inge was introduced in the House of Lords on 25 June 2012 and made his maiden speech three days later on 28 June. He joined his first cousin in the Upper House, Peter, Field Marshall Lord Inge, a former Chief of the Defence Staff. On 15 February 2013 it was announced that he had been appointed to the office of Lord High Almoner, a post in the royal household.

Views
In November 2022, he published a letter alongside his suffragan bishop, Martin Gorick, that stated "the time has come for the Church to celebrate and honour same sex relations" and supported the introduction of same-sex marriage in the Church of England.

Personal life
Inge was married to Denise; she died from cancer on April 20, 2014, at the age of 51. Together they had two daughters. He remarried in January 2018 to Helen.

Honours
Inge was awarded an honorary DLitt from the University of Worcester in 2011.

Publications 
As well as numerous articles, he is the author of A Christian Theology of Place (2003), which was shortlisted for the Michael Ramsey Prize for Theological Writing, and Living Love: in Conversation with the No 1. Ladies' Detective Agency (2007).

Styles
The Reverend John Inge (1983–1996)
The Reverend Canon John Inge (1996–2002)
The Reverend Canon Doctor John Inge (2002–2003)
The Right Reverend Doctor John Inge (2003–present)

References

Alumni of St Chad's College, Durham
Bishops of Huntingdon
Bishops of Worcester
Lords Spiritual
21st-century Church of England bishops
1955 births
Living people
Alumni of Keble College, Oxford
People educated at Kent College
People associated with the University of Worcester